Tranmere Rovers F.C. played the 1926–27 season in the Football League Third Division North. It was their sixth season of league football, and they finished 9th of 22. They reached the First Round of the FA Cup.

Football League

References 

Tranmere Rovers F.C. seasons